Splinter was an American left-leaning news and opinion website owned by G/O Media. It launched in July 2017 and ceased publication in November 2019.

Content
The site was a news and opinion website. According to direct owner Fusion Media Group, the site's purpose was to offer a sharp point of view, amplify underrepresented voices, shine a light on systemic inequality, and skewer politicians when necessary as well as contextualize current events, challenge archaic establishments, and champion the historically oppressed. They were generally described as having a left-leaning editorial stance.

History
Splinter began as the article part of the Fusion TV website in 2013. Univision later acquired the assets of Gizmodo Media Group which gave it a significant web presence. The decision was made to separate the Fusion TV channel from its news and editorial site. The reasoning for the change being that it would provide clarity between the news site and the cable network whose content was broadening and  moving further and further away from what the site was publishing.

On July 24, 2017, Fusion relaunched its article-based online presence under the brand Splinter while things relating to the channel itself remained at Fusion.net branded as Fusion TV. The article-based half of Fusion's website content switched to the fusion.kinja.com domain in May prior to the re branding. Splinter began  under the Gizmodo Media Group division of Univision. On October 10, 2019, Splinter announced it was ceasing publication. The staff posted the last post on November 12, 2019. Staff from Splinter started the independent Discourse Blog in March 2020.

References

External links

American news websites
Former Univision Communications subsidiaries
Fusion Media Group
Progressivism in the United States
Internet properties established in 2017
2017 establishments in the United States
Internet properties disestablished in 2019
2019 disestablishments in the United States